Dub Radio or Дуб Радио is a Bosnian local public radio station, broadcasting from Bosanska Dubica/Kozarska Dubica, Bosnia and Herzegovina.

Radio Bosanska Dubica was launched in  1972 by the municipal council of Bosanska Dubica. In Yugoslavia and in SR Bosnia and Herzegovina, it was part of local/municipal Radio Sarajevo network affiliate.

The program is mainly produced in Serbian. Estimated number of potential listeners of Dub Radio is around 19,545. Radiostation is also available in neighboring Croatia.

Local public cable television channel RTV KD is also part of public municipality services.

See also 
List of radio stations in Bosnia and Herzegovina

Frequencies
 Bosanska Dubica/Brod

References

External links 
 www.rtv-kd.com
 www.fmscan.org
 Communications Regulatory Agency of Bosnia and Herzegovina

Bosanski Brod
Radio stations established in 1972